Peter O'Sullivan (born 1943) is an Irish retired hurler who played as a goalkeeper for the Tipperary senior team.

O'Sullivan joined the team as substitute goalkeeper during the 1963 championship, and took over as first-choice goalkeeper at the end of the decade. He retained that position until his retirement after the 1972 championship. During that time he won one All-Ireland medal and one Munster medal.

At club level O'Sullivan enjoyed a lengthy career with Cashel King Cormacs GAA.

Playing career

Club

O'Sullivan played his club hurling with his local Cashel club.

Inter-county

O'Sullivan first came to prominence on the inter-county scene as a member of the Tipperary minor hurling team in the early 1960s. He won a Munster title in this grade in 1961, following a 7-11 to 1-6 trouncing of fierce rivals Cork.  Tipp subsequently lined out against Kilkenny in the All-Ireland minor decider. A high-scoring game developed over the hour, however, O'Sullivan let in three goals and Kilkenny emerged victorious by 3-13 to 0-15.

O'Sullivan later joined the county under-21 team. Here he won a Munster title in the inaugural year of the competition in 1964, following an 8-9 to 3-1 thrashing of Waterford.  An All-Ireland final appearance beckoned, with Wexford providing the opposition. That game also turned into a rout, as Tipp won easily by 8-9 to 3-1. The victory gave O'Sullivan's an All-Ireland  under-21 winners' medal.

O'Sullivan subsequently joined the Tipperary senior inter-county team, making his debut as a substitute in the Munster final defeat by Cork in 1970. He became the first-choice goalkeeper on the team in 1971 and it proved to be a successful year. That year he started in his first full Munster final against Limerick. An exciting game developed, however, at the full-time whistle Tipp were the 4-16 to 3-18 winners. Kilkenny provided the opposition against Tipperary in the subsequent All-Ireland final, the first to be broadcast in colour by Telfis Éireann. In an exciting and high-scoring game Tipp relied on two freak goals to capture a 5-17 to 5-14 victory. The game itself is still remembered for the image of Babs Keating discarding his worn-out boots and playing the last few minutes of the match in his bare feet. The victory gave O'Sullivan a senior All-Ireland winners' medal in the senior grade.

Tipperary quickly surrendered their Munster and All-Ireland titles in 1972, and O'Sullivan was replaced as goalkeeper in 1973.

Inter-provincial

O'Sullivan also lined out with Munster in the inter-provincial hurling championship.  He played in the Railway Cup final of 1972, however, Leinster won the title by 3-12 to 1-10.

References

Teams

1943 births
Living people
Tipperary inter-county hurlers
Cashel King Cormac's hurlers
Munster inter-provincial hurlers
Hurling goalkeepers
All-Ireland Senior Hurling Championship winners